Jade Louise Ewen (born 24 January 1988) is a British singer, actress and a former member of the girl group Sugababes. She began her singing career in a girl group named Trinity Stone, which signed with Sony BMG in 2005 but disbanded in 2007 without releasing an album. In 2009, after winning the right, she represented the United Kingdom in the 2009 Eurovision Song Contest by performing the Andrew Lloyd Webber / Diane Warren penned "It's My Time". She finished in fifth place.

Ewen controversially replaced Keisha Buchanan in the group Sugababes in September 2009. After becoming a member of the group, the group achieved two UK top-ten singles and a top-fifteen album before disbanding in 2011.

In 2015, Ewen made her West End debut, playing Vanessa in the original London cast of In the Heights, following a brief run off-West End the previous year. She went on to play Princess Jasmine in 2016, as part of the original cast of Disney's production of Aladdin.

Early life 
Ewen was born on 24 January 1988 and grew up in Plaistow, London, the child of Trevor and Carol Ewen. Her mother is Jamaican while her father is of Italian descent and was raised in Scotland. Trevor is blind and partially deaf, while Carol is visually impaired.  Because of her parents' disabilities, Ewen is a caregiver to both of her parents as well as her two younger siblings, Shereen and Kiel. Ewen started singing and taking dance classes before she was even four. She attended New City Primary School then Brampton Manor Academy before transferring to the Sylvia Young Theatre School (SYTS) after receiving a scholarship. While a student at SYTS, she appeared in the television productions The Bill, Casualty, Mr. Harvey Lights a Candle and The Ghost Hunter. At the age of ten, Ewen went to an open audition for The Lion King. She was offered the part of Young Nala.

Career

2002–2009: Early career and Eurovision 
Ewen appeared in the children's dance DVD, How To Dance. She was briefly featured in the video for Busted's "What I Go to School For". From 2003 to 2004, she appeared in the Noggin series Out There. In 2005, Ewen became a member of the girl group Trinity Stone, which signed with Sony BMG. The group disbanded in 2007. She later recorded with rapper Kwamé, who was impressed with her work on MySpace. She released a digital single, "Got You", in 2008 under Kwame's Make Noise label. Ewen co-wrote the song "A Little Bit" for the girl group Booty Luv, as well as the song "Let Me Be Me" for Jessica Mauboy. In early 2009, Ewen acted in the first episode of the series Myths.

In January 2009, Ewen was approached for and participated in the process to select the UK representative for the Eurovision Song Contest 2009. She was selected to represent the UK with her performance of the song "It's My Time", composed by Andrew Lloyd Webber, who accompanied her on piano. Ewen finished in fifth place at Eurovision, the highest placing for the UK since 2002. Having already signed with Polydor Records before the Eurovision selection, Ewen began working on her debut album.

2009–2011: Sugababes and solo projects 

In September 2009, Ewen joined the group Sugababes as the replacement for Keisha Buchanan. While her single, "My Man", had been released the week she joined the trio, promotional activities for it were cancelled. Nonetheless, it debuted at number 35 on the UK Singles Chart. In an interview with the BBC, Ewen confirmed her commitment to the Sugababes was her main priority and that her solo album had been put on hold. Ewen did not meet the members of the Sugababes until two days before the video shoot for their single "About a Girl" in Los Angeles, having been flown there without being notified that she would be replacing Buchanan. "About a Girl" debuted at number eight in the UK. Sweet 7 was released in early 2010 after multiple delays during 2009, and charted at number 14 on the UK Albums Chart. The second single to feature Ewen's vocals, "Wear My Kiss", peaked at number 7 in the UK.

The Sugababes began recording an eighth studio album in April 2010. In late 2010, Ewen became the face of Miss Ultimo lingerie. In 2011, the group and their management, Crown Talent & Media Group, left their record label of ten years, Island Records, for a new three-album distribution deal with Sony Music's RCA Records. Crown Talent & Media Group was the acting record label. A promotional single under the new label, "Freedom", was released for free on 25 September 2011.

2013–present: West End, stage and television work 
On 15 March 2013, Ewen confirmed that Sugababes would record new music at some point during 2013, stating: "I think we will probably come back together again at the end of the year. There will definitely be more recording but, there is no release date anytime soon." On 1 August 2013, she revealed the Sugababes were no longer recording in the studio together, stating the group was "pretty much done" 

In summer 2014, Ewen played the supporting role of Clara in the Regent's Park Open Air Theatre production of Porgy and Bess. The musical opened to 4 and 5 star reviews, with The Guardian writing of Jade's performance, "Jade Ewen brings a moving simplicity to Clara, who follows her heart and pays the price." In April 2015, Jade was due to have a lead role in Godspell at the Hackney Empire, before moving on to a 28-venue national tour. Ewen had to drop out due to ill health, saying she was "saddened" to withdraw. In September 2015, it was announced that Jade would be joining the cast of In the Heights in its West End transfer, in the role of Vanessa. The musical received positive reviews. In November 2015, it was announced that she would play the role of Princess Jasmine in the musical Aladdin at the Prince Edward Theatre. Ewen later sued Disney for over £200,000 alleging damage to her voice from having to sing too loudly to be heard over Matthew Croke who played Aladdin.

Discography

Singles

As lead artist

As featured artist

Music videos

Filmography

Television

Cinema

References

External links 

 
 
 
 Jade Ewen on Magic Chilled

1988 births
Living people
English people of Jamaican descent
English people of Scottish descent
English people of Sicilian descent
English people of Italian descent
Eurovision Song Contest entrants for the United Kingdom
English women singer-songwriters
English television actresses
Eurovision Song Contest entrants of 2009
Actresses from London
Singers from London
Sugababes members
Alumni of the Sylvia Young Theatre School
21st-century English actresses
Black British actresses
21st-century Black British women singers
People from Plaistow, Newham
English women pop singers